Terry Robinson may refer to:

 Terry Robinson (football chairman), English football chairman and director
 Terry Robinson (footballer), English footballer
 Terry Robinson (Neighbours), a fictional character from the Australian soap opera Neighbours